Kenneth Charles Iman (February 8, 1939 – November 13, 2010) was an American football center who played 15 seasons in the National Football League (NFL) with the Green Bay Packers and the Los Angeles Rams, from 1961 to 1975.

Playing career
Iman played in three consecutive NFL championship games with the Packers from 1960 to 1962, winning two, as well as one with the Rams (1974), a loss. He started 140 straight games with the Rams from 1965 to '74 and was voted team MVP in 1972.

After losing divisional round games in 1969 and 1973, the Rams won one in the 1974–75 NFL playoffs, beating the Washington Redskins while amassing 131 yards on the ground, with Iman, Tom Mack, and Joe Scibelli strong up the middle, but lost the NFC championship game to the Minnesota Vikings. Iman was replaced in 1975 by Rich Saul.

Coaching
Iman was an offensive line coach for the Philadelphia Eagles from 1976 to 1986 under coaches Dick Vermeil, Marion Campbell, and Buddy Ryan. During his time with the Eagles, he was instrumental in the development of Pro Bowl tackles Jerry Sisemore and Stan Walters. He was an assistant coach on the Eagles 1980 NFC championship squad. After his coaching career, Iman served as a Philadelphia Eagles sales account executive for 10 years.

References

1939 births
2010 deaths
American football centers
Green Bay Packers players
Los Angeles Rams players
Philadelphia Eagles coaches
Southeast Missouri State Redhawks football players
Players of American football from St. Louis